The Casa Briet (Briet house) is a private building at 24 Sant Josep Street, in the city center of Alcoy (Alicante), Valencian Community, Spain.

Building 
The building was designed by the Valencian architect Timoteo Briet Montaud in 1910 for his own family home. It is a clear example of Valencian Art Nouveau architecture of the early twentieth century.

The promoter and owner of the building was Timoteo Briet Montaud. It is a private residential building of small size, with ground floor, mezzanine and three floors.

Stands out the utilization of the stone, the floral decoration and the ornamental details, influence of the Secession Art Nouveau movement.

References

Bibliography 
 Doménech Romá, Jorge (2010). Modernismo en Alcoy, su contexto histórico y los oficios artesanales. Editorial Aguaclara. pp. 421–428. .

See also 
 Art Nouveau in Alcoy

External links 

Casa Briet in Alcoy Tourism 

Art Nouveau architecture in Alcoy
1910 establishments in Spain